Eugene F. Scanlon Sr. (December 19, 1924 – March 10, 1994) is a former Democratic member of the Pennsylvania State Senate who represented the 42nd District from 1975 until his death in 1994. He was also a member of the Pennsylvania House of Representatives.

References

1924 births
1994 deaths
Politicians from Pittsburgh
Democratic Party members of the Pennsylvania House of Representatives
Democratic Party Pennsylvania state senators
20th-century American politicians